Ada Blackjack (née Delutuk; May 10, 1898 – May 29, 1983) was an Iñupiat woman who lived for two years as a castaway on the uninhabited Wrangel Island, north of Siberia.

Background
Ada Blackjack Johnson was born in the remote settlement of Spruce Creek, eight miles from Solomon, Alaska. Ada's father died of food poisoning when she was eight years old, and her mother sent her and her sister, Rita, to a Methodist mission school in Nome, Alaska. She was raised by missionaries who taught her to read English and sew. She married Jack Blackjack, a former hunter and dogsled driver, at age 16 and moved to the Seward Peninsula.  The Blackjacks had three children, only one of whom survived infancy. Jack abused Ada, finally deserting her and their surviving son, Bennet. Ada obtained a divorce before her husband could return and walked forty miles with Bennet to Nome, where her mother was living. Ada cleaned houses and sewed clothes for miners to survive, but was still unable to afford Bennet's tuberculosis treatment. Due to this, she temporarily had to place Bennett in the Jesse Lee Home for Children, which could better care for his tuberculosis. Ada became committed to making money to be reunited with her son.

Nome police chief E.R. Jordan was familiar with Ada's situation, so he mentioned to her that some men were recruiting Inuit to go with them on their Arctic expeditions across the Chukchi Sea to  Wrangel Island. While Jordan was not familiar with the purpose of the expedition, he believed that Ada, who spoke English and was an excellent sewer, might be a good fit for the mission, which needed someone to sew fur clothing for the team. The expedition was led by Canadian explorer Allan Crawford but financed, planned and encouraged by Vilhjalmur Stefansson. Stefansson remained behind to fundraise for another exploration to search for a continent north of Wrangel Island. He believed that the Arctic would be easily habitable for those willing to adapt.

Expedition

Stefansson sent five settlers (one European Canadian, three European Americans, and one Iñupiat, Blackjack) in a speculative attempt to claim the island for Canada. The explorers were handpicked by Stefansson based upon their previous experience and academic credentials. Stefansson considered those with advanced knowledge in the fields of geography and other sciences for the expedition.

On 15 September 1921, the team was left on Wrangel Island north of Siberia, to claim the island for Canada or the United Kingdom. Blackjack had many misgivings about joining the expedition, especially because she had been misled to believe she would be only one of many Alaska Native people to join the crew. The team included five people: Blackjack, who had been hired as a cook and seamstress; the American men Lorne Knight, Milton Galle, and Fred Maurer; and Allan Crawford. Maurer had spent eight months on the island in 1914 after surviving the shipwreck of the Karluk.

The conditions on the island were adequate at first, but after a year turned for the worse. Rations ran out, and the team was unable to kill enough game on the island to survive. On 28 January 1923, three of the men finally attempted to cross the 90-mile frozen Chukchi Sea to Siberia for help and food, leaving Blackjack and the ailing Knight behind. Knight was affected by scurvy and was cared for by Ada until he died on June 23, 1923. The other three men were never seen again, and so Blackjack was alone, except for the expedition's cat, Victoria. Blackjack survived in the extremely cold conditions until she was rescued almost eight months later on 19 August 1923 by a former colleague of Stefansson's, Harold Noice. Some newspapers hailed her as the real "female Robinson Crusoe".

Blackjack used the money she saved to take her son to Seattle, Washington to treat his tuberculosis. She remarried and had another son, Billy. Eventually, she returned to the Arctic, where she lived until the age of 85.

Last years
Blackjack was a quiet person and hated the media circus that developed around her and the attempts by Stefansson and her rescuer Noice to exploit her story. Except for her expedition salary and a few hundred dollars she had earned for the furs she trapped on Wrangel, Blackjack did not benefit from her ordeal and received no compensation from the books that were written about her.

Blackjack died in the state retirement facility, the Pioneer Home, in Palmer, Alaska, and was buried in Anchorage.

References

Further reading

External links 
Ada Blackjack papers at Dartmouth College Library

1898 births
1983 deaths
Castaways
Chukchi Sea
Inupiat people
People from Nome, Alaska
Sole survivors
20th-century Native Americans
Female_polar_explorers